This is a list of mathematics history topics, by Wikipedia page. See also list of mathematicians, timeline of mathematics, history of mathematics, list of publications in mathematics.

1729 (anecdote)
Adequality
Archimedes Palimpsest
Archimedes' use of infinitesimals
Arithmetization of analysis
Brachistochrone curve
Chinese mathematics
Cours d'Analyse
Edinburgh Mathematical Society
Erlangen programme
Fermat's Last Theorem
Greek mathematics
Thomas Little Heath
Hilbert's problems
History of topos theory
Hyperbolic quaternion
Indian mathematics
Islamic mathematics
Italian school of algebraic geometry
Kraków School of Mathematics
Law of Continuity
Lwów School of Mathematics
Nicolas Bourbaki
Non-Euclidean geometry
Scottish Café
Seven bridges of Königsberg
Spectral theory
Synthetic geometry
Tautochrone curve
Unifying theories in mathematics
Waring's problem
Warsaw School of Mathematics

Academic positions

Lowndean Professor of Astronomy and Geometry
Lucasian professor
Rouse Ball Professor of Mathematics
Sadleirian Chair

See also
 

History